Jørgen Wagner Hansen (15 September 1925 – 17 July 1969) was a Danish footballer who competed in the 1952 Summer Olympics. He was also part of Denmark's squad for the football tournament at the 1948 Summer Olympics, but he did not play in any matches.

Hansen scored the Denmark goal in a 3–1 defeat against Scotland in May 1951.

Beside being a footballer, Hansen was a physician and became chief physician at the hospital in Holbæk in 1964.

Honours
Denmark
 Olympic Bronze Medal: 1948

References

1925 births
1969 deaths
Association football forwards
Danish men's footballers
Olympic footballers of Denmark
Footballers at the 1952 Summer Olympics
Kjøbenhavns Boldklub players
Denmark international footballers
Olympic bronze medalists for Denmark
People from Frederiksberg
Sportspeople from the Capital Region of Denmark